Shoka Khamis Juma is a Member of Parliament in the National Assembly of Tanzania.

References

Sources
 Parliament of Tanzania  website

Members of the National Assembly (Tanzania)
Living people
Year of birth missing (living people)
Place of birth missing (living people)